Los Palmeras are an Argentine cumbia band from Santa Fe, Argentina founded in 1972.

Discography

References

Argentine musical groups